The following list includes notable musicians who were born or have lived in Chicago, Illinois.

A

B

C

D

E

F

G

H

I

J

K

L

M

N

O

P

R

S

T

V

W

Y

Z

Bands

References

Chicago-related lists
Chicago
Chicago
People from Chicago